Omega-6 fatty acids (also referred to as ω-6 fatty acids or n-6 fatty acids) are a family of polyunsaturated fatty acids that have in common a final carbon-carbon double bond in the n-6 position, that is, the sixth bond, counting from the methyl end.

Health effects 
One review found that an increased intake of omega‐6 fatty acids has been shown to reduce total serum cholesterol and may reduce myocardial infarction (heart attack). The same review found no significant change in LDL cholesterol and triglycerides. A 2021 review found that omega 6 supplements do not affect the risk of CVD morbidity and mortality.

Dietary sources
Dietary sources of omega-6 fatty acids include:
 poultry
 eggs
 nuts
 hulled sesame seeds
 cereals
 durum wheat
 whole-grain breads
 pumpkin seeds
 hemp seeds

Vegetable oils 
Vegetable oils are a major source of omega-6 linoleic acid. Worldwide, more than 100 million metric tons of vegetable oils are extracted annually from palm fruits, soybean seeds, rape seeds, and sunflower seeds, providing more than 32 million metric tons of omega-6 linoleic acid and 4 million metric tons of omega-3 alpha-linolenic acid.

List of omega-6 fatty acids 

The melting point of the fatty acids increases as the number of carbons in the chain increases.

See also

 Cattle feeding
 Essential fatty acid interactions
 Essential nutrients
 Inflammation
 Linolenic acid
 Lipid peroxidation
 Olive oil regulation and adulteration
 Omega-3 fatty acid
 Omega-7 fatty acid
 Omega-9 fatty acid
 Ratio of fatty acids in different foods
 Wheat germ oil

References

Bibliography 

Fatty acids
Essential nutrients
Treatment of bipolar disorder
Alkenoic acids

de:Omega-n-Fettsäuren#Omega-6-Fettsäuren